Hudson's Bay Montreal Downtown is a building complex on the corner of Saint Catherine Street West and Union Avenue in downtown Montreal, Quebec, Canada. It was originally named the Henry Morgan Building (French: Maison Morgan), and operated as the flagship store of the Morgan's department store chain from 1891–1972. It became the provincial flagship store of its successor, The Bay, in 1972 (rebranded to Hudson's Bay in 2013).

The store is accessible to the Montreal Metro via McGill station, for which an entrance is located on Union Avenue.

History

1891–1972: Morgan's 

Built from 1889 to 1891 to a design by the American architect John Pearce Hill (1849–1920), the four-storey Neo-Romanesque building was constructed from imported Scottish Old Red Sandstone for Morgan's department store, which HBC acquired in 1960. The site had previously been occupied by terrace-type townhouses along Saint Catherine, Union and Alymer, built with stones from the ruins of the 1849 Parliament Building, including the former home of Dr. William Hales Hingston, mayor of Montreal from 1875 to 1877, at the southwest corner.

The building was modified in 1923 (eight-storey Beaux-Arts style addition clad with red stone to match the original store) and 1964 (eight-storey modernist annex along De Maisonneuve Boulevard). The later addition is mostly windowless, with windows only on ground level and in four arch features along De Maisonneuve and Union.

1972–present: Hudson's Bay 
While the Morgan's stores in Ontario were converted to the Hudson's Bay Company nameplate in 1960 and rebranded to The Bay in 1965, the Morgan's stores in Quebec retained their original name until 1972.

HBC announced plans to renovate Hudson's Bay Montreal Downtown to accommodate a  Saks Fifth Avenue facing De Maisonneuve Boulevard in 2016. The project was expected to be completed by fall 2018, but plans had been shelved by that February.

See also 
 Phillips Square, located south of the store
 Promenades Cathédrale, connected underground with the store
 Hudson's Bay Queen Street, flagship store in Toronto
 Hudson's Bay Vancouver Downtown, flagship store in Vancouver

References 

Hudson's Bay Company
Landmarks in Montreal
Downtown Montreal
Sandstone buildings in Canada
Department store buildings in Canada
Romanesque Revival architecture in Canada
Beaux-Arts architecture in Canada